Anthodiscus chocoensis is a species of plant in the Caryocaraceae family. It is found in Colombia, Costa Rica, and Panama. It is threatened by habitat loss.

References

chocoensis
Vulnerable plants
Taxonomy articles created by Polbot